Melbecks is a civil parish in North Yorkshire, England. It is located in upper Swaledale and covers the settlements of Gunnerside, Low Row, Feetham and Kearton.

The parish council conducts meetings alternately between the villages of Gunnerside and Low Row.

References 

Civil parishes in North Yorkshire
Richmondshire